Bengal Nagpur Railway Football Club (also known as BNR Recreation Club) is an Indian institutional football club based in Kolkata, West Bengal. Founded in 1929, the club competes in the Premier Division B of the Calcutta Football League.

History
The Bengal Nagpur Railway Recreation Club was established in 1929 as the recreational arm of Bengal Nagpur Railway (BNR), now known as South Eastern Railway (one of the companies, credited for pioneering the development of railways in eastern and central India). The BNR Club were associated with sports like Football, Cricket, Field hockey and Water Polo.

The Bengal Nagpur Railway FC reached the first division of Calcutta Football League in 1949 and as an institutional team was a force to reckon in Kolkata football during their golden period in the 1960s. They won the prestigious IFA Shield in 1963 and Rovers Cup in 1964–65. BNR also achieved success at the 1967 Durand Cup, in which they finished as runners-up.

Notable players
Notable players who have played for the Bengal Nagpur Railway FC include Sheoo Mewalal, Tulsidas Balaram, Arun Ghosh, K. Appalaraju, Rajendra Mohan, Samar Banerjee, Sudip Chatterjee. Among them, Appalaraju emerged as top scorer of the CFL in 1959 with BNR.

Honours

League
CFL Second Division
Champions (1): 1949

Cup
IFA Shield
Champions (1): 1963
Runners-up (1): 1966
Durand Cup
Runners-up (1): 1967
Rovers Cup
Champions (1): 1964–65
Sikkim Gold Cup
Runners-up (1): 2009
EK Nayanar Memorial Gold Cup
Champions (1): 2012

Other departments

Field hockey
Alongside football, field hockey is practiced in BNR. From the British Raj, it was having Anglo-Indian players, who led the club various nationwide tournaments. Affiliated with the Bengal Hockey Association (BHA), the club participated in prestigious Beighton Cup and Calcutta Hockey League.

Honours
 Beighton Cup
Champions (5): 1937, 1939, 1943, 1944, 1945
Runners-up (8): 1931, 1932, 1935, 1938, 1942, 1946, 1968, 1994
 Calcutta Hockey League
Champions (4): 1965, 1966, 1967, 1994
 Bombay Gold Cup
Champions (1): 1965

Cricket
BNR club has its cricket section, which is affiliated to the Cricket Association of Bengal (CAB), and competes in numerous regional tournaments including the First Division League, and J.C. Mukherjee T-20 Trophy.

Honours
 CAB First Division League
Champions (1): 2010–11
 CAB Senior Knockout
Champions (1): 1962–63

Women's football
Women's football is also being practiced in BNR, and the team participates in regional tournaments.

See also

Football in Kolkata
List of football clubs in India

References

Further reading

External links
 of BNR Recreation Club
Bengal Nagpur Railway FC at Soccerway

Association football clubs established in 1929
Football clubs in Kolkata
1929 establishments in India
Railway association football clubs in India